Feijoa sellowiana also known as Acca sellowiana (O.Berg) Burret, is a species of flowering plant in the myrtle family, Myrtaceae. It is native to the highlands of southern Brazil, eastern Paraguay, Uruguay, northern Argentina, and Colombia. It is widely cultivated as an ornamental tree and for its fruit. Common names include feijoa (or ), pineapple guava and guavasteen, although it is not a true guava. It is an evergreen shrub or small tree,  in height.

Etymology 
Feijoa sellowiana Berg is from the genus which the German botanist, Ernst Berger, named after João da Silva Feijó, a Portuguese naturalist, and the specific name honors Friedrich Sellow, a German who first collected specimens of feijoa in southern Brazil. It has been nicknamed "pineapple guava", "Brazilian guava", "fig guava" or "guavasteen" among different countries.

Fruit 
The fruit, known as feijoa, matures in autumn and is green, ellipsoid, and about the size of a chicken egg. It has a sweet, aromatic flavour, which tastes like pineapple, apple, and mint. The flesh is juicy and is divided into a clear, gelatinous seed pulp and a firmer, slightly granular, opaque flesh nearer the skin. The fruit falls to the ground when ripe and at its fullest flavour, but it may be picked from the tree prior to falling to prevent bruising.

The fruit pulp resembles the closely related guava, having a gritty texture. The feijoa pulp is used in some natural cosmetic products as an exfoliant. Feijoa fruit has a distinctive, potent smell that resembles that of a fine perfume. The aroma is due to the ester methyl benzoate and related compounds that exist in the fruit.

Growing conditions 
The plant is a warm-temperate, subtropical plant that also will grow in the tropics, but requires at least 50 hours of winter chilling to fruit, and is frost-tolerant. When grown from seed, feijoas are noted for slow growth during their first year or two, and young plants, though cold tolerant, can be sensitive to high wind.

In the Northern Hemisphere, the species has been cultivated in the United Kingdom and as far north as western Scotland, but under such conditions it does not fruit every year, as winter temperatures below approximately  kill the flower buds. Summer temperatures above  may also have an adverse effect upon fruit set. Feijoas are somewhat tolerant of drought and salt in soils, though fruit production can be adversely affected. Tolerant to partial shade, regular watering is essential while the fruit is maturing.

Cultivation 

Some grafted cultivars of feijoa are self-fertile. Most are not and require a pollinator. Seedlings may or may not be of usable quality; and may or may not be self-fertile. Feijoas will mature into a sprawly shrub but can be kept successfully as a large container plant, though accommodations will need to be made for the width of the plants, and the need to encourage new growth for fruit production.

Feijoas are occasionally found as landscape plants in Texas, Florida, California, and the maritime Pacific Northwest. They can succeed in greenhouses in temperate parts of the United States; and have been grown in-ground as fruiting trees on the United States east coast in coastal Georgia and South Carolina as well as in California. Other regions of the United States such as the southernmost Appalachian Mountains, and the immediate coastal region from North Carolina to Delaware would warrant further investigation.

The fruit has been widely grown in New Zealand since the 1920s, and it has become a popular garden tree. It is commonly available in season from March to June. In New Zealand, the pollinators of this plant are bees, bumblebees, and medium-sized birds. The silvereye is a pollinator in the cooler parts of the South Island; the blackbird and the Indian myna, which feeds on the sweet, fleshy flower petals, are pollinators further north. In some areas where the species has been introduced, however, the trees have been unproductive due to lack of pollinators. The shrub has very few insect pests, although guava moth is a problem in northern New Zealand.

Sale and shipping 
Ripe fruit is prone to bruising; difficulty maintaining the fruit in good condition for any length of time, along with the short period of optimum ripeness and full flavor, probably explains why feijoas are not exported frequently, and are typically sold close to where they are grown. However, intercontinental shipping of feijoa by sea or air has been successful.

Because of the relatively short shelf life, storekeepers need to be careful to replace older fruit regularly to ensure high quality. In some countries, they also may be purchased at roadside stalls, often at a lower price.

Feijoas may be cool-stored for approximately a month and still have a few days of shelf life at optimum eating maturity. They also may be frozen for up to one year without a loss in quality.

Consumption

Nutrition 

 of raw feijoa provides 55 calories and is 13% carbohydrates, 8% sugars, and 1% each of fat and protein. The raw fruit is a rich source of vitamin C, providing 40% of the Daily Value, but supplies no other micronutrients in significant amount.

Food uses 
Although the skin is edible, the fruit usually is eaten by cutting it in half, then scooping out the pulp with a spoon. The fruit has a juicy, sweet seed pulp and slightly gritty flesh nearer the skin. The flower petals are edible. The most common uses are eating raw, desserts such as sorbet, sweet pies, crumbles, or in salads. They are regularly consumed by birds.

Varieties 
Numerous cultivars of feijoa have been developed. These include:
 Anatoki
 Apollo
 Bambina
 Barton
 Den's Choice
 Choiceana
 Coolidge
 Edenvale Improved Coolidge
 Edenvale Late
 Edenvale Supreme
 Gemini
 Kaiteri
 Kakariki (a cultivar developed by Waimea Nurseries, New Zealand, large flavor-filled fruit, named for the Māori word for green)
 Mammoth – named for its relatively massive fruits
 Moore
 Nazemetz
 Opal Star
 Pineapple Gem
 Smilax – mid-sized, spherical fruits with smooth texture
 Trask
 Triumph
 Unique (NZ cultivar, particularly tolerant of clay soils, and self pollinating)
 Vista Long – noted for the long shape of its fruits, developed in Vista, CA
 Wiki Tu

References

External links 

 Feijoa: Plants for a Future
 Le feijoa, à voir et à manger dans Jardins de France N°647

Myrtaceae
Plants described in 1941
Crops originating from Argentina
Crops originating from Brazil
Crops originating from Uruguay
Trees of Argentina
Trees of Brazil
Trees of Uruguay
Tropical fruit